Mr. Loco, also known as Mister Loco or Mr. Loco Band, is a Mexican band formed in 1975. They sing mostly in English and occasionally in Spanish. Their sound is a combination of pop rock and Latin American folk.

History
Mister Loco is an offshoot band established by previous members of the rock band Los Locos Del Ritmo. The members are Javier (Xavier) Garza Alarcón, Jorge García Castil, and Rafael Acosta. Although Mister Loco was formed in 1975, individually the six members studied Latin American folk and modern music for fifteen years. Mister Loco was formed with a somewhat adventurous and original idea: to combine traditional Latin rhythms and instruments with popular music. In 1975, they would win the World Popular Song Festival at the Nippon Budokan in Tokyo

Nacho Libre
In 2006, the band featured on the soundtrack for director Jared Hess's film Nacho Libre. Hombre Religioso (Religious Man) is the title song, and the songs Bubble Gum and Papas also feature in the film.

Discography

Albums
 Uno (1975)
 Lucky Man (1976)
 Sencillamente Nunca (1978)
 Dancing Loco Disco (as "Mr. Loco Loco")  (1979)
 Mystic (2007)

Singles
 "Lucky Man" (1975, Mexico) 
 "Bubble Gum" / "(Tu) Solo Tu'' (1976)
 "Mr Loco"
 "Religious Man"
 "Papas"
 "Religious Man" w/ Danny Elfman
 "Cancun Moon" (2007)
 "Rocking Mariachis" (2007)
 "Nacho Libre" (2007)
 "Sacred Secrets" (2007)

References

External links
Official Site
Myspace.com
www.indiestore.com
www.last.fm
www.youtube.com

Mexican musical groups
Winners of Yamaha Music Festival
Mexican folk music groups